Gozzo is a surname. Notable people with the surname include:

Michael Gozzo, American Track and Field Athlete 
Conrad Gozzo, American trumpeter
Mauro Gozzo, American baseball player

See also
Gozo